Extended Revelation for the Psychic Weaklings of the Western Civilization is the second studio album by the Swedish band The Soundtrack of Our Lives. It was the band's last Europe only release.

The album is made up of 50% material left over from their debut, Welcome to the Infant Freebase, and 50% new material. This record sees the band experimenting with darker and more psychedelic soundscapes.

The title of this album comes from the Rolling Stones Records' release of Brian Jones Presents the Pipes of Pan at Joujouka, where the inside liner notes state that "Western Civilization has made us such Psychic Weaklings"

Track listing

Bonus tracks on 2002 vinyl release
 "When Lighting Bugs Arrive"
 "Greatest Hit Providers"

Singles
 "Black Star"

Personnel
Mattias Bärjed – guitar, backing vocals
Åke Karl Kalle Gustafsson – bass, backing vocals
Martin Hederos – piano, organ, backing vocals
Ebbot Lundberg – lead vocals
Ian Person – guitar, backing vocals
Fredrik Sandsten – drums, percussion

References

External links
Official site
Official U.S. site
VH1 artist site
MTV artist site

1998 albums
The Soundtrack of Our Lives albums